The women's shot put at the 1971 European Athletics Championships was held in Helsinki, Finland, at Helsinki Olympic Stadium on 10 August 1971.

Medalists

Results

Final
10 August

Participation
According to an unofficial count, 14 athletes from 9 countries participated in the event.

 (1)
 (1)
 (3)
 (1)
 (1)
 (1)
 (1)
 (3)
 (2)

References

Shot put
Shot put at the European Athletics Championships
1971 in women's athletics